Antiochus (221 BC–193 BC) was a Seleucid prince, first-born child to the Seleucid monarchs Antiochus III the Great and Laodice III, and his father's first heir.

Biography
Antiochus was of Greek Macedonian and Persian descent. In 210 BC, his father made him joint king, when Antiochus III went off to the East on his great expedition. He was partly in command of the Seleucid army at the victory at Panion in 200 BC. He is not recorded to have had any real independent authority, but he was appointed viceroy of the eastern Seleucid satrapies. Antiochus is named in several decrees and letters with his father.

In 200 BC, Antiochus was present at the battle of Panium and received the command over the right wing of the cavalry; it was he who routed the Egyptian cavalry and attacked the Ptolemaic center from the rear with his victorious cavalry.  In 196 BC, Antiochus was appointed as the heir to the Seleucid throne. In that year, his father arranged for him to marry his younger sister Laodice IV. The marriage between Laodice IV and Antiochus was the first sibling marriage to occur in the Seleucid dynasty. From their sibling union, Laodice IV bore Antiochus a daughter called Nysa.

In 193 BC, Antiochus III appointed his daughter, the sister-wife of his son, Antiochus, as the chief priestess of the state cult dedicated to their late mother Laodice III in Media. Later that year, Antiochus died. His family were in complete grief of his death, in particular Antiochus III. Antiochus was succeeded by his younger brother Seleucus IV Philopator.

See also
 
 List of Syrian monarchs
 Timeline of Syrian history

References

Sources
 J.D. Grainger, A Seleukid prosopography and gazetteer, BRILL, 1997

External links

Seleucid dynasty
3rd-century BC Greek people
2nd-century BC Greek people
Greek people of Iranian descent
Antiochus 04
2nd-century BC Babylonian kings
3rd-century BC Babylonian kings